Rajaduar is a village in North Guwahati.

Place of interest
The famous Doul Govinda Temple is located here. Chandra Bharati hills near Doul Govinda Temple was abode of medieval litterateur Chandra Bharati.

See also
 Guwakuchi

References

Archaeological sites in Kamrup region
Villages in Kamrup district